Dolocucullia dentilinea is a species of moth in the family Noctuidae (the owlet moths).

The MONA or Hodges number for Dolocucullia dentilinea is 10188.

References

Further reading

 
 
 

Cuculliinae
Articles created by Qbugbot
Moths described in 1899